National Litigation Policy is formulated by the Ministry of Law and Justice of the Government of India to bring down the litigation from government agencies by making them more responsible in filing cases.

Background
The litigation process is lengthy and time-consuming in India. In 2010, 2.5 crore (25 million) legal cases were pending at various levels of the judiciary across the country.

Policy
The National Litigation Policy is based on the recognition that government and its various agencies are the predominant litigants in courts and tribunals in the country. Its aim is to transform government into an efficient and responsible litigant. This policy is also based on the recognition that it is the responsibility of the government to protect the rights of citizens, to respect fundamental rights and those in charge of the conduct of government litigation should never forget this basic principle.

Efficient litigant means:
 Focusing on the core issues involved in the litigation and addressing them squarely.
 Managing and conducting litigation in a cohesive, coordinated and time-bound manner.
 Ensuring that good cases are won and bad cases are not needlessly persevered with.
 A litigant who is represented by competent and sensitive legal persons: competent in their skills and sensitive to the facts that government is not an ordinary litigant and that a litigation does not have to be won at any cost.

Responsible litigant means:
 That litigation will not be resorted to for the sake of litigating.
 That false pleas and technical points will not be taken and shall be discouraged.
 Ensuring that the correct facts and all relevant documents will be placed before the court.
 That nothing will be suppressed from the court and there will be no attempt to mislead any court or Tribunal.

The government must cease to be a compulsive litigant. The philosophy that matters should be left to the courts for ultimate decision has to be discarded. The easy approach, “Let the court decide,” must be eschewed and condemned.

The purpose underlying this policy is also to reduce Government litigation in courts so that valuable court time would be spent in resolving other pending cases so as to achieve the Goal in the National Legal Mission to reduce average pendency time from 15 years to 3 years. Litigators on behalf of Government have to keep in mind the principles incorporated in the National mission for judicial reforms which includes identifying bottlenecks which the Government and its agencies may be concerned with and also removing unnecessary Government cases. Prioritisation in litigation has to be achieved with particular emphasis on welfare legislation, social reform, weaker sections and senior citizens and other categories requiring assistance must be given utmost priority.

Salient features
The salient features of the policy are
 To ensure government agencies being responsible while filing cases.
 It instructs to place correct facts, all relevant documents before the court/tribunal and not to mislead them.
 Pending cases with government as party to be reviewed on priority basis to enable quick disposal.
 Proposed a monitoring and review mechanism to sensitize government in important cases and avoid delay and neglect of the same.

See also
 Digital India
 Internet of Things
 E-courts In India
 Online dispute resolution
 Judiciary of India

References

External links

 Digital India
 Draft Internet of Things(IoT) Policy

Policies of India
Law of India